Group D of the EuroBasket Women 2017 took place between 16 and 19 June 2017. The group played all of its games at Prague, Czech Republic.

Standings

All times are local (UTC+2).

Matches

Belgium vs Montenegro

Latvia vs Russia

Montenegro vs Latvia

Russia vs Belgium

Latvia vs Belgium

Montenegro vs Russia

External links
Official website

Group D
2016–17 in Belgian basketball
2016–17 in Latvian basketball
2016–17 in Russian basketball
2016–17 in Montenegrin basketball